Arrondissement of Neufchâteau may refer to:
 Arrondissement of Neufchâteau, Belgium, an arrondissement in the Province of Luxembourg in Belgium
 Arrondissement of Neufchâteau, Vosges, an arrondissement in the Vosges department in France